Alexis Manaças da Silva Santos (born 23 March 1992) is a Portuguese medley swimmer.

He competed at the 2015 World Aquatics Championships and at the 2016 Summer Olympics in Rio de Janeiro. At club level, he represents Sporting CP.

References

External links
 

1992 births
Living people
Swimmers from Lisbon
Portuguese male medley swimmers
Olympic swimmers of Portugal
Swimmers at the 2016 Summer Olympics
Swimmers at the 2010 Summer Youth Olympics
Swimmers at the 2018 Mediterranean Games
Mediterranean Games bronze medalists for Portugal
Mediterranean Games medalists in swimming
Swimmers at the 2020 Summer Olympics
20th-century Portuguese people
21st-century Portuguese people
Swimmers at the 2022 Mediterranean Games